Mamadou Diouma Daniel Camara (born 1974, in Toulouse, France), better known as Dadoo, is a French rapper and also a member of rap band . He has performed several duets with singer Vitaa.

Dadoo is competing in his second Lavaman Triathlon in 2015 to raise money for the Leukemia & Lymphoma Society.

Biography

Beginnings with KDD
He started in 1994 with the group  and quickly became its leader. The group was made of five members (Dadoo otherwise known as Dadppda, Diesel, H2O, Lindsay and Robert) who signed a contract with Columbia. Their first album Opte pour le K came out in 1996; next came the album Résurrection in 1998 and Une Couleur de plus au Drapeau  in 2000, both considered as original classics of French rap. Later the group separated after selling more than 200,000 albums. A new path was ahead for him.

After KDD
Dadoo quickly changed to a solo career. He initiated many musical projects and collaborations with: Akhenaton, Kool Shen, Rohff, Oxmo Puccino, Vitaa, Diam's, Joeystarr, even Jean-Michel Jarre for the remix of Oxygène.
The movie, produced by Gilles Paquet-Brenner in 2003, and will feature Titoff, Stomy Bugsy and Noémie Lenoir.
Then, he co-directed the BO of Taxi 3 for Luc Besson, who saw rising stars like Diam, Vitaa, Corneille, Korr and Scalp. In the same year, he wrote for Alain Chabat the music for the movie RRRrrrr!!!, a wacky movie filmed in 2003, with les Robins des Bois.
In 2003, produced by Sony Columbia, his first solo album France History X which is regarded as a definitive, high-value example of French rap. The album showed a timeless analysis of the French wealthy's differences and contradictions. The title Sales Gosses met an immediate success with a music video with Jamel Debbouze, Éric et Ramzy, Dieudonné and Joeystarr. The titles Où vous-êtes, France History X and Fille facile also saw large successes.
It was in 2014 when Dadoo launched the formation of Dadoo and the Classics who hoped to blend hip hop strictly MC + KEYS + DRUMS.

Composition career
Dadoo, who gained more interest in composition, completed the first album of Joeystarr Gare au Jaguarr in 2006. The album was a clear success and was named in the victoires de la musique 2007 in the "Urban Music" category. As producer of the tour that followed the release of the album, Dadoo joined with Joeystarr on stage with the neo-metal group Enhancer.
In 2009 his career took a turn as he became part of the new rock group "D and the Zepp". Dadoo became the singer/bassist and was accompanied by Alain "Dricks" Lasseube.
At the same time, he wrote TV advertisements. Dadoo also tried successfully to produce with the producer Xavier Marchand's official teasers of Festival Garorock.

Discography

Albums
 1996 : Opte Pour Le K (with KDD)
 1998 : Résurrection (with KDD)
 2000 : Une Couleur De Plus Au Drapeau (with KDD)
 2003 : France History X
 2017 : VANI THE GR8 (with KDD)

Featured on
 1998
Driver Feat KDD, Dany Dan & Diam's – On fout le dawa on the album Driver, Le grand chelem
 1999
KDD Feat Fonky Family, Sinistre, Akhenaton, Chiens de Paille, Mystik, Prodige Namor, Soldafada, 2 Neg, Yazid & Endo – 16'30 contre la censure sur le maxi 16'30 contre la censure.
With the collective Liberté de Circulation on les p'tits papiers (especially with Diesel of KDD).
 2000
‘'’KDD'’’ – Repose en paix sur compile Nouvelle Donne 2
‘'’KDD'’’ – Pose pas d'questions on the album La Squale
 2001
Akhenaton Feat Dadoo – Nuits à medine on the album d'Akh, Sol Invictus
Dadoo Feat Kazkami – Les guerriers de la nuit on the album Première Classe Vol.2
Dadoo Feat Tandem & Busta Flex – Sport de sang on the album Mission Suicide
Dadoo – Les ripoux on the album Mission Suicide
Dadoo Feat Tandem & Tunisiano – Meilleurs vœux Part II on the album Mission Suicide
Dadoo – Le grand show on the B.O. of the movie Yamakasi
KDD – Red light on the album Sachons saying NON Vol.2
Oxmo Puccino Feat KDD – Balance la sauce on the album d'Oxmo, L'amour est mort
 2002
Dadoo Feat Vitaa – Pas à pas sur la compilation Double Face 4
Don Choa Feat Dadoo – Sale Sud on the album Don choa, Vapeurs Toxiques
La Boussole Feat Dadoo – Entrevue on the album la Boussole, Rappel
KDD - Militant sur la compile Les militants Hors série
 2003
Dadoo – Les 7 Q capitaux sur la B.O. du film Double Zéro
Dadoo – Making off sur la B.O. du film Taxi 3
Dadoo Feat Diam's – Vivre sans ça sur la B.O. du film Taxi 3
Dadoo – Petite sœur sur la B.O. du film Taxi 3
 2004
IPM Feat Dadoo & Diesel – Le mal en patience on the album d'IPM, 1 pied dans l'biz
Dadoo – Ding Ding sur the album de RRRrrrr!!!
Dadoo – 100 toi sur the album Bâtiment B : Hommage.
 2005
Dadoo – Parce Qu'on a Le Blues sur la compile Illicite Projet
Dadoo Feat Acid & Perverted Monks – We Flow sur la compile The Basement
Kool Shen Feat Dadoo & Rohff – L'avenir est à nous sur le maxi L'avenir est à nous
Lady Laistee Feat Dadoo – Corda on the album Lady Laistee, Second souffle
Lady Laistee Feat Dadoo – Le monde d'aujourd'hui on the album Lady Laistee, Second souffle
Lady Laistee Feat Dadoo – Si peu de choses on the album Lady Laistee, Second souffle
Jeff Le Nerf Feat Dadoo – IV my People music on the album IV my People, IV my People Mission
 2006
JoeyStarr Feat Dadoo – 93 Déboule on the album JoeyStarr, Gare au jaguarr
 2008
Enhancer Feat Dadoo – 4444 on the album Enhancer, Désobéir
 2015
Jeune Ras Feat Dadoo – Rouler tout la nuit sur le EP de Jeune Ras, 3h du mat

References

French rappers
Living people
French people of Senegalese descent
Musicians from Toulouse
1976 births